Amanda Boyden is an American novelist.

Born in Northern Minnesota and raised in Chicago and St. Louis, she studied creative writing at the University of New Orleans, where she and her ex-husband, Canadian writer Joseph Boyden, were faculty members until 2012. In addition to writing, Amanda Boyden is a trapeze artist who founded Aerialists, Inc., her own all-female troupe, and performed as Lady Hummingbird.

Works
 Pretty Little Dirty (2006)
 Babylon Rolling (2008)
 I got the dog (2020)

External links
 Amanda Boyden author profile at randomhouse.com

21st-century American novelists
American women novelists
University of New Orleans faculty
Living people
Year of birth missing (living people)
21st-century American women writers
Novelists from Louisiana
American women academics